Jozephus Johannes Antonius Franciscus "Sjef" van Run (12 January 1904 – 17 December 1973) was a Dutch football defender who played for the Netherlands in the 1934 FIFA World Cup. He also played for PSV Eindhoven, appearing in 359 league matches between 1926 and 1942. He was part of the Netherlands squad at the 1928 Summer Olympics, but did not play in any matches.

References

External links
 

1904 births
1973 deaths
Dutch footballers
Netherlands international footballers
Association football defenders
PSV Eindhoven players
1934 FIFA World Cup players
Olympic footballers of the Netherlands
Footballers at the 1928 Summer Olympics
Sportspeople from 's-Hertogenbosch
Footballers from North Brabant